The fat mouse (Steatomys pratensis) is a species of rodent in the family Nesomyidae.
It is found in Angola, Botswana, Cameroon, Democratic Republic of the Congo, Malawi, Mozambique, Namibia, South Africa, Tanzania, Zambia, and Zimbabwe.
Its natural habitats are dry savanna and subtropical or tropical dry lowland grassland.

References

 Schlitter, D. & Monadjem, A. 2004.  Steatomys pratensis.   2006 IUCN Red List of Threatened Species.   Downloaded on 20 July 2007.

Steatomys
Mammals described in 1846
Taxa named by Wilhelm Peters
Taxonomy articles created by Polbot